Paul Anantharajah Tambyah (born 5 February 1965), is a Singaporean doctor and professor of infectious diseases, a politician, and a writer. He is President of the Asia Pacific Society of Clinical Microbiology and Infection and also President of the International Society for Infectious Diseases. He is also the Chairman of the Singapore Democratic Party, a position he has held since September 2017.

Early life and education
Born in Singapore to the endocrinologist Dr John Tambyah and social worker Leaena Chelliah on 5 February 1965, Tambyah learned Mandarin as a second language in Saint Andrew's School and can converse in Mandarin. He later attended Raffles Institution in 1981. Tambyah graduated from the National University of Singapore with Bachelor of Medicine, Bachelor of Surgery to become a doctor in 1988. He did his postgraduate training in Infectious disease under Dr Dennis G. Maki at the University of Wisconsin and graduated in 1999.

Career

Medical career 
After completing his training in Wisconsin, he returned to Singapore as the first and only infectious diseases consultant at National University Hospital. In 2000 he became one of the committee members of the Action for AIDS Singapore, the only HIV/AIDS agency in Singapore first founded in 1988. Tambyah became an associate Professor of Medicine in 2001.  During the SARS outbreak in 2003, Tambyah helped establish the NUH Division of Infectious Diseases, with Professor Dale Fisher and trainee Dr Louis Chai joined in December 2004. Since then, the Division has grown and currently includes 13 consultants, a resident physician and 2 senior residents.

In 2011, Tambyah became the President of the Asia-Pacific Society of Clinical Microbiology and Infection, and led the Singapore Society of Infectious Diseases from 2011 to 2015.  Tambyah eventually became a full professor on 5 July 2013. 

Tambyah became the assistant Dean of Yong Loo Lin School of Medicine, National University of Singapore in 2015. In June 2020, he became a president-elect of the International Society for Infectious Diseases, set to become the first Singaporean to hold the position and was expected to start his term in 2022.

On 6 December 2020, Tambyah received a Red Ribbon Award by Action for AIDS Singapore for his contributions to HIV-related causes.

On 5 October 2021, Tambyah was recognised as one of the four eminent senior clinicians to receive the Distinguished Senior Clinician Award as conferred by the Ministry of Health in Singapore.

On 20 December 2022, Tambyah became the new President of the International Society of Infectious Diseases Executive Committee, replacing Alison Holmes who would currently served as its immediate past-President.

Activism
Tambyah was noted to be one of the founding members of MARUAH Singapore, a human rights organization which was founded in 2007 in Singapore. Due to the limitations of civil society activism, he eventually left the organization to join politics.

Political career

Tambyah started getting involved with the Singapore Democratic Party in 2010 and spoke as a guest speaker at the SDP rallies during the 2011 Singaporean general election. He was one of the two potential candidates with the then party treasurer Dr Vincent Wijeysingha for the 2013 Punggol East by-election on January, before the party announced its decision not to contest and backed the Workers' Party to compete against the People's Action Party.

Tambyah became a member of the SDP's Healthcare Advisory Panel in July 2013. In 2015, he became a political candidate as part of the SDP team and contested the Holland–Bukit Timah Group Representation Constituency (GRC) in the 2015 Singaporean general election.

On 26 September 2017, he was elected as Chairman by the CEC members during the Singapore Democratic Party 18th Ordinary Party Conference, replacing Wong Souk Yee.

On 30 June 2020, Tambyah was fielded as a SDP candidate for the Bukit Panjang Single Member Constituency during the 2020 Singaporean general election.

Personal life
In 1991, Tambyah married Dr Siok Kuan, a senior lecturer of marketing at NUS Business School.

References

1965 births
Living people
Singapore Democratic Party politicians
Singaporean activists
Saint Andrew's School, Singapore alumni
National University of Singapore alumni
Singaporean healthcare managers
Singaporean infectious disease physicians
20th-century Singaporean physicians
21st-century Singaporean physicians